is an anime series produced at the animation studio MAPPA by Mages. It was directed by Yutaka Uemura and written by Kotaro Uchikoshi, and features music by Tetsuya Komuro and character designs by Shōta Iwasaki. It premiered on the Fuji Television programming block Noitamina on April 10, 2015, and was streamed by Crunchyroll in several other regions as it aired in Japan. In Australia, it is also streamed on AnimeLab. The series is being released for home media in Japan by Aniplex on DVD and Blu-ray in six volumes. Another home media release is planned by Sentai Filmworks, which has licensed the series for North America.

The story follows Yūta Iridatsu, whose soul gets separated from his body. As a spirit, he watches the daily lives of the inhabitants of an apartment.

The opening theme of the series, "PUNCH LINE!", was composed and written by Ken'ichi Maeyamada, and performed by Shoko Nakagawa and Dempagumi.inc under the name Shokotan Dempagumi.inc.

Episode list

Media release 
The series is being released in six volumes on DVD and Blu-ray by Aniplex in Japan. Each volume includes a character song; the first volume also includes a clean version of the series' opening and ending, a collection of commercials and promotional videos for the series, and the storyboards of episode 1; volumes 2 through 6 include a booklet.

Notes

References

External links 
  
 

Punch Line